The British Academy Scotland Awards are presented annually at an awards ceremony organised by BAFTA Scotland.

History
The annual British Academy Scotland Awards were launched in 2004 to recognise outstanding achievement by individuals working in the Film and Television industry in Scotland. A long list of potential nominees is put to a popular vote of BAFTA Scotland members. A jury of industry professionals vote for the overall winner from the short list created by the members. A members of the BAFTA Scotland Committee will chair each of the juries.

The awards were cancelled in 2010 and prizes at the 2011 ceremony given for films released over the previous 2 years.

Over the years the annual event has taken place at various locations including the Glasgow City Halls and the Glasgow Science centre. From 2011 it has been held at the Radison Blu Hotel in Glasgow.

In 2015, the British Academy Scotland Award trophy was redesigned by Scottish designer Oliver J. Conway whom was an apprentice of the original trophy designer, Allan Ross.

Hosts

Lorraine Kelly (2007, 2009)
Edith Bowman (2008, 2012, 2013, 2015–present)
Kevin Bridges (2011)
Hazel Irvine (2014)

Awards categories (competitive)
Categories as of 2016.

Outstanding Contribution to Film/Television

Every year, a special award is presented to an individual in recognition of their contribution to Scottish Film and/or Television.

See also
 BAFTA Scotland
 British Academy of Film and Television Arts

References

External links
 BAFTA in Scotland
 BAFTA

Scotland
Scotland
Scotland
British film awards
British television awards
Award ceremonies in the United Kingdom
Awards established in 1986
Annual events in Scotland
Scottish awards